Delia Sescioreanu Mask (born 16 March 1986) is a retired Romanian tennis player.

Sescioreanu has won five singles and two doubles titles on the ITF tour in her career. On 11 October 2004, she reached her best singles ranking of world number 145. On 5 April 2004, she peaked at world number 235 in the doubles rankings.

Career

2004 
Sescioreanu then won three qualifying matches to advance to the main draw in Palermo. she played Italian Rita Grande in the first round, defeating the former world number 24 in straight sets. In round two, she lost to  Slovenian Katarina Srebotnik.

2005 
Sescioreanu made her WTA tour main draw debut at the 2005 Hyderabad Open. She lost in the first round to Indian Sania Mirza.

ITF finals (7–5)

Singles (5–2)

Doubles (2–3)

External links
 
 

Living people
Romanian female tennis players
1986 births
People from Timiș County